The MAN NL202 was a low floor single-decker bus built by MAN Nutzfahrzeuge from the late 1980s until 1992. It is derived from the VöV SL-II bus standard. Especially sold in Europe, in particular in Germany, it was replaced by MAN NL262. It was additionally sold in South Australia, in diesel and Compressed natural gas variants, the latter of which continues to be used to this day in significant numbers.

It has used a fully low floor configuration inside the bus with seats mounted on platforms similar to the MAN NL262 and the Mercedes-Benz O405N.

See also
Mercedes-Benz O405N
MAN NG272

Low-floor buses
NL202
Vehicles introduced in 1989